These are the episodes of the anime television series Kimba the White Lion (Jungle Emperor). The series originally ran from October 6, 1965, to September 28, 1966, in Japan and from September 11, 1966, to September 3, 1967, in the United States.

There were two English dubs produced for this anime series. The first (and more widely viewed) English dub was produced by Titan Productions for NBC Enterprises to license and run in syndication in the United States, with a handful of talented voice actors. Despite the fact that they dubbed all 52 episodes of the series, 49 of them have been aired in a mixed-up order in the United States, due to the NBC catalog order of how they aired them in sequence.   On September 30, 1978, the license for NBC to hold the rights to the English dub has dropped due to the bankruptcy of Mushi Productions earlier in 1973. Afterwards, the Titan Productions English dub was no longer available to view at that time.

In 1993, Fumio Suzuki made plans to bring the series to television once more to the English-speaking market. After the legal battles of who was going to gain ownership, a Canadian company from Toronto known as Zaza Sound Productions Ltd. won the rights to produce a second English dub of the anime series with a handful of Canadian voice actors, as well as airing this dub in several English-speaking regions (Australia, United Kingdom, etc.), with CEG Distribution distributing the series. Landmark Entertainment Group Inc., Susuki Associates and CEG Cinema Partners have also contributed to this dub. Fans have often labeled this as the "Canadian dub". It was said to be a remake of the 1966 US English dub, with a more faithful translation of the original Japanese scripts, but had to create a whole new soundtrack composed by Paul J. Zaza, since they were unable to use the original soundtrack composed by Isao Tomita which was also used in the 1966 US English dub. This version was also more edited including heavy cuts and changes.

In 1995, A low-budget American company known as UAV Corporation released a limited number of episodes of the 1993 Canadian English re-dub on VHS in North America, under the title Kimba the Lion Prince.

Episode list

See also
 Osamu Tezuka

References

Kimba the White Lion
Jungle Emperor Leo